Brighton and Hove Integrated Care Service is a not-for-profit social enterprise and GP Federation based in Brighton.

The service commissioned Age UK and Brighton and Hove Impetus in 2014 to recruit 60 volunteers to work in GP surgeries to ease the pressure in their surgeries and keep people out of hospital.  The project – known as EPIC (Extended Primary Integrated Care) – also uses nurses and pharmacists to deal with minor ailments and medicine reviews.

The organisation won a contract for dermatology services from Brighton and Hove Clinical Commissioning Group - a service which they had been providing since 2010 but had to withdraw when it could not reach agreement with its proposed subcontractors.

In 2016 it changed its name to Here.

See also
 Healthcare in Sussex

References

External links
 BICS website

Health in Sussex
Primary care